Blanchard is a city in Page County, Iowa, United States. The population was 29 at the 2020 census.

A small section of the city unofficially reaches into Missouri. This territory is known as South Blanchard.

History
Blanchard was laid out in 1879, and a post office was established that same year. It was incorporated as a town in 1880.

Geography
Blanchard is located at  (40.579649, -95.220889).

Landmarks

The city is the southern terminus of the Wabash Trace, a former rail line converted to a bicycle trail. It had a tiny gas station, which lay entirely in Missouri. Colorful signs on the property inform the motorist of his exact location. A Cropmate nitrogen fertilizer plant is located two miles north of Blanchard.

Demographics

2010 census
As of the census of 2010, there were 38 people, 18 households, and 12 families residing in the city. The racial makeup of the city was 100.0% White.

There were 18 households, of which 16.7% had children under the age of 18 living with them, 55.6% were married couples living together, 5.6% had a female householder with no husband present, 5.6% had a male householder with no wife present, and 33.3% were non-families. 27.8% of all households were made up of individuals, and 16.7% had someone living alone who was 65 years of age or older. The average household size was 2.11 and the average family size was 2.58.

The median age in the city was 46 years. 10.5% of residents were under the age of 18; 13.2% were between the ages of 18 and 24; 26.3% were from 25 to 44; 31.5% were from 45 to 64; and 18.4% were 65 years of age or older. The gender makeup of the city was 50.0% male and 50.0% female.

2000 census
As of the census of 2000, there were 61 people, 28 households, and 16 families residing in the city. The racial makeup of the city was 100.00% White.

There were 28 households, out of which 25.0% of the households had children under the age of 18 living with them, 42.9% were married couples living together, 3.6% had a female householder with no husband present, and 39.3% were non-families. 32.1% of all households were made up of individuals, and 25.0% had someone living alone who was 65 years of age or older. The average household size was 2.18 and the average family size was 2.71.

21.3% are under the age of 18, 9.8% from 18 to 24, 31.1% from 25 to 44, 13.1% from 45 to 64, and 24.6% who were 65 years of age or older. The median age was 32 years. For every 100 females, there were 103.3 males. For every 100 females age 18 and over, there were 100.0 males.

The median income for a household in the city was $37,917, and the median income for a family was $31,250. Males had a median income of $25,000 versus $21,250 for females. The per capita income for the city was $15,226. There were 9.5% of families and 5.7% of the population living below the poverty line, including 11.1% of under eighteens and none of those over 64.

Education
It is in the South Page Community School District.

Notable person 

Pat Ragan, baseball player.

References

Cities in Iowa
Cities in Page County, Iowa